Many Kisses Later  is a 2009 Italian-French romantic comedy film directed and co-written by Fausto Brizzi and interpreted by an ensemble cast.

The film, produced by Italian International Film, in co-production with the French company and Mes Films in collaboration with RAI Cinema. It was released 6 February 2009 in Italian cinema and has been recognized as "national cultural interest" by the Directorate General for Cinema of the Ministry of Heritage and Culture.

Plot 
The film presents the love stories of six couples, intertwined and developed between Christmas and Valentine's Day.

Sergio (Claudio Bisio), psychologist, divorced for years by Michela (Elena Sofia Ricci), is engaged to Roberta (Giorgia Wurth), but is found to be a father of two teenagers, after the sudden death of former wife, discovering by the daughters themselves, that Michela has always loved him, despite the divorce.

Filippo (Vincenzo Salemme) and Caterina (Nancy Brilli), are both divorced and struggling not to have custody of the children who see only as an obstacle to their activities. Judge Luca (Silvio Orlando) instead forces them to stay all four together and spend time doing the activities to which children are interested and then going to the theater, exhibitions and nature parks. The two not only enjoy, but find they still love each other.

The same judge Luca and his wife Loredana (Carla Signoris) are broken, and he moved to live in the student house of his son, to live with pleasure seeking divorced life. Due to an accident which occurred to her, there will be a rapprochement.

Giulia (Cristiana Capotondi), daughter of Luca and Loredana, lives with Marc (Malik Zidi) in Paris, but she is transferred from the embassy where she works, due to promotion to Wellington, New Zealand.

Elisa (Claudia Gerini) is about to marry Corrado (Gianmarco Tognazzi), but his former boyfriend Lorenzo (Flavio Insinna) in the most unpredictable: it is the priest (Don Lorenzo) that will get them married. On the altar of the three will have an important turn.

Monique (Cécile Cassel), a friend of Elisa's, is engaged to Paolo (Fabio De Luigi), a surgeon, who is threatened by the policeman Davide (Alessandro Gassman), former boyfriend of Monique. In the end, Monique leaves Paolo, who finds himself having to operate the same Davide, wounded in the stomach with a bullet. Although Paolo has repeatedly threatened, he will perform his mission and they become friends.

Cast
 Alessandro Gassman: Davide
 Cécile Cassel: Monique
 Claudia Gerini: Elisa
 Cristiana Capotondi: Giulia
 Malik Zidi: Marc
 Gianmarco Tognazzi: Corrado
 Silvio Orlando: Luca
 Fabio De Luigi: Paolo
 Claudio Bisio: Sergio
 Vincenzo Salemme: Filippo
 Flavio Insinna: Don Lorenzo
 Giorgia Wurth: Roberta
 Elena Sofia Ricci: Michela
 Enrico Montesano: Mario
 Nancy Brilli: Caterina
 Carla Signoris: Loredana
 Martina Pinto: Valentina
 Vincenzo Alfieri: Andrea
 Angelo Infanti: Elisa's father
 Francesca Nunzi:Antonella
 Nathalie Rapti Gomez: Noemi

Production 
Filming began on 15 July 2008 and ended on 4 October and the film was shot in Rome, Paris and South Africa.

Biagio Antonacci composed two songs specially for the film, "Il cielo ha una porta sola" (it, "The Sky Has a Single Door") and "Aprila" ("Open It"), both included on the album . The video for "Open It" was played by Giorgia Wurth.

The original soundtrack of the movie is by Bruno Zambrini. The soundtrack in two CD includes several Italian and foreign songs of the past, including "Fiumi di parole" ("Rivers of Words") done live in the film in a cameo by Alessandra Drusian and Fabio Ricci, known to the public as the duo Jalisse. Enzo Salvi and  also make cameo appearances in the film.

In the closing credits of the film there are photos and videos of a hundred anonymous kisses, sent to the web site of the film during the months preceding the release.

It became a box office hit in Cannes becoming the best selling Italian film among the participating nations.

Box office

Other media
The book Il manuale degli Ex (The Handbook of Ex), written by Fausto Brizzi and published by Mondadori, was released at the same time as the film.

Awards
Ex received 10 David di Donatello nominations: best film, director, screenplay, supporting actor Claudio Bisio, Actress Carla Signoris, editing, music, original song, sound, David Young It also received six nominations for the Silver Ribbon: Best Comedy, Best Screenplay, Editing, Original Song, Supporting Actor Claudio Bisio – Silvio Orlando (all candidates), actress Carla Signoris, the film won the Silver Ribbon for best comedy special.

Remake

A French remake entitled  (Les Ex in French speaking markets) was released in 2017.

External links 

 

2009 films
French romantic comedy films
Italian romantic comedy films
2000s Italian-language films
Films set in Rome
Films set in Paris
Films set in New Zealand
Films shot in Rome
Films shot in Paris
Films shot in South Africa
Films directed by Fausto Brizzi
Films produced by Fulvio Lucisano
Films scored by Bruno Zambrini
2000s French films